Statistics of the México Primera División for the 1966–67 season.

Overview

Nuevo León was promoted to Primera División.

The season was contested by 16 teams, and Toluca won the championship.

Ciudad Madero was relegated to Segunda División.

Teams

League standings

Results

Notes

References
Mexico - List of final tables (RSSSF)
Mexico - Season 1966/67 (RSSSF)

1966-67
Mex
1966–67 in Mexican football